Jillali Ferhati (born in 1948) is a Moroccan filmmaker.

Biography 
Ferhati was born in 1948 in Aït Ouahi near Khémisset but grew up in Tangier. He studied sociology and literature in Paris and then launched his career in theater, working as an actor and director at the Theatre International in Paris. In 1982, he founded  "Heracles Production", a production company.

His debut in cinema was in 1978 with the feature film Brèche dans le mur (A Breach In the Wall), selected for the Semaine de la Critique at the Cannes Film Festival. His 1982 film Arais Min Kassab  was screened at the 1982 Cannes Film Festival in the Directors' Fortnight section, and his 1991 film The Beach of Lost Children was entered into the main competition at the 48th edition of the Venice Film Festival.

He is married to the director and screenwriter Farida Benlyazid, who often collaborated with him.

Filmography 

 1978: A Breach in the Wall / Charkhun fi-l hâ'it
 1981 : Poupées de roseau / Araïs min qasab (Arais Min Kassab)
 1986: The Dream of Tangiers
 1991 : The Beach of Lost Children / Shâtiu al-atfâl al-mafoûdin
 1995: Horses of fortune / Kuius al-has
 1995 : Five films for a hundred years
 2000 : Braids
 2004 : Memory in detention
 2009: From dawn
 2013 : Sarirou Al Assrar (Pillow secrets | Secrets d'oreiller)
 2016-2017 : Ultimate revolt

References

External links 
 

1947 births
Living people
People from Khemisset
Moroccan film actors
Moroccan film directors
Moroccan film producers
Moroccan screenwriters